Morgan Elizabeth Hurd (born July 18, 2001) is an American artistic gymnast and a five-time member of the United States women's national team (2016–21).  She is the 2017 World all-around champion and balance beam silver medalist and the 2018 World all-around bronze medalist and floor exercise silver medalist. She has won four medals at the USA Gymnastics National Championships during her senior career and is a two-time American Cup champion. She was a member of the gold-medal winning American teams at the 2018 World Championships and the 2019 Pan American Games.

Personal life
Hurd was adopted from Wuzhou, China when she was 11 months old.  At age 3, she was enrolled in gymnastics. Hurd started training at First State Gymnastics when she was in fifth grade.  She currently resides in Middletown, Delaware with her mother, Sherri. She is one of the rare elite gymnasts to wear glasses during competition.

Junior career

2014
Morgan Hurd competed in the Nastia Liukin Cup in 2014, where she placed 14th as a level 10. She tied for 8th place at the American Classic in July.  At the U.S. Classic, Hurd placed 18th behind future fellow National Team member Victoria Nguyen. At the P&G National Championships Hurd finished 29th in the all-around for Juniors.

2015
In 2015, Hurd started with the U.S. Classic where she finished 9th on All-Around and 2nd on Uneven Bars. She competed at the P&G National Championships, where she placed 8th in the All-Around, 7th on Floor Exercise, and tied for 4th on the Uneven Bars.

2016
In 2016, Hurd competed at the American Classic where she finished 1st in the All-Around. She competed next at the U.S. Secret Classic where she placed 5th in the All-Around, 1st on Floor Exercise, and 2nd on the Uneven Bars. She competed at the P&G National Championships again and placed 5th in the All-Around, 3rd on Uneven Bars, and 7th on Vault; these results qualified her to the junior national team.

Senior career

2017
In 2017, Hurd turned senior. She made her international debut at the 2017 Stuttgart World Cup, where she finished third in the all-around behind Tabea Alt of Germany and Angelina Melnikova of Russia.  In April, Hurd competed at the City of Jesolo Trophy and helped the United States finish first. In July, Hurd competed at the U.S. Classic where she placed 6th on balance beam and 2nd on floor, behind Jade Carey. In August, she competed at the P&G National Championships where she placed 6th in the All-Around, eight on Uneven Bars, fifth on Balance Beam, and tenth on Floor Exercise. Since she finished in the top six in the All-Around, she was named to the national team.

In September, Hurd was selected to represent the United States at the 2017 Artistic Gymnastics World Championships in Montreal alongside Ragan Smith, Jade Carey, and Ashton Locklear. At the World Championships in Montreal, Morgan started out on the vault in qualifications, receiving a 14.466. On her next event, the uneven bars, she scored 14.333. On the balance beam, she scored 13.500 after upgrading to a full-twisting double tuck dismount, qualifying 2nd into the beam finals. She ended qualifications on floor, where she showed great skills and artistry, but fell on her double full for a score of 12.533. Her total all around score was 54.832, and she qualified 6th into the all-around final. In the all-around final, Hurd won a surprise victory with a total score of 55.232, 0.1 ahead of silver medalist Ellie Black of Canada and 0.4 ahead of bronze medalist Elena Eremina of Russia. Two days later in the balance beam final, she matched her ranking from qualifications and won the silver medal, behind Pauline Schäfer of Germany.

2018
On December 11, 2017, Hurd was selected to represent the United States at the 2018 American Cup. She competed alongside first-year senior Maile O'Keefe and finished first overall with a score of 56.599. On April 8, Hurd was named to the team to compete at the 2018 Pacific Rim Gymnastics Championships which included fellow seniors Grace McCallum and Jordan Chiles. There she won team gold and placed second in the all-around behind McCallum after a mishap on her balance beam dismount. Due to her balance beam accident, she withdrew from the uneven bars and floor exercise event finals as a precaution.

On July 28, Hurd competed at the 2018 U.S. Classic where she finished third in the all-around behind Simone Biles and Riley McCusker, despite falling off the balance beam. She also finished third on uneven bars and floor exercise. In August, Hurd competed at the National Championships where she placed second in the all-around behind Biles, third on uneven bars behind Biles and McCusker, and third on floor exercise behind Biles and Jade Carey. She also placed fourth on balance beam, making her and Biles the only competitors to place in the top four on every event they competed. She was named to the national team for the third year in a row.

In October, Hurd participated in the Worlds Team Selection Camp. During the competition a shaky performance caused her to place fourth in the all-around behind Biles, McCusker, and McCallum, fourth on uneven bars, fifth on vault, sixth on balance beam, and seventh on floor exercise. The following day she was named to the team to compete at the 2018 World Championships alongside Biles, McCusker, Grace McCallum, Kara Eaker, and alternate Ragan Smith.  During qualifications, Hurd qualified to the all-around final in second place behind Biles, the floor exercise final in fourth place, and the uneven bars final in fifth place. The US also qualified to the team final in first place.  During the team final, Hurd competed on vault, uneven bars, and floor exercise.  She contributed scores of 14.633, 14.433, and 12.966 respectively towards the USA's team total.  USA won gold with a score of 171.629, 8.766 points ahead of second place Russia, beating previous margin of victory records set in the open-ended code of points era at the 2014 World Championships (6.693) and the 2016 Olympic Games (8.209).

In the all-around final, Hurd put her hands down on her side aerial cartwheel on beam and was in fourth place entering the final rotation. She recovered with a strong floor exercise performance to win the bronze medal behind Biles and Mai Murakami of Japan. In a very close podium finish, Hurd finished 0.066 points behind Murakami, 0.033 points ahead of fourth-place finisher Nina Derwael of Belgium, and 0.034 points ahead of fifth-place finisher Angelina Melnikova of Russia. During event finals, Hurd placed sixth on uneven bars. She then won the silver medal on floor exercise behind Biles and ahead of 2017 World champion Murakami and 2017 European champion Melnikova. With five world championship medals, Hurd became the seventh-most decorated American female gymnast in world championship history, tied with Kim Zmeskal and Kyla Ross.

On November 5, Hurd made her music video debut, appearing in Shawn Mendes' Youth.  In December Hurd underwent her third elbow surgery to have two chips removed.

2019
In February, USA Gymnastics announced that Hurd was selected to compete at the Tokyo World Cup in April.  There she won gold ahead of Ellie Black of Canada and Asuka Teramoto of Japan.

In June, after the conclusion of the American Classic, Hurd was named as one of the eight athletes being considered for the team to compete at the 2019 Pan American Games along with Sloane Blakely, Kara Eaker, Aleah Finnegan, Shilese Jones, Sunisa Lee, Riley McCusker, and Leanne Wong.

On July 9, it was announced that Hurd would be featured in a year-long documentary series on the Olympic Channel titled All Around, alongside Angelina Melnikova of Russia and Chen Yile of China, which will follow their journeys and training leading up to the 2020 Summer Olympics in Tokyo.

At the 2019 GK US Classic in July, Hurd finished sixth in the all-around behind Simone Biles, McCusker, Grace McCallum, Eaker, and Wong. She placed first on bars, tied for eighth on beam with Sunisa Lee, and placed eleventh on floor.  After the competition, she was named to the team to compete at the Pan American Games alongside Eaker, Finnegan, McCusker, and Wong.

At the Pan American Games Hurd competed on all four events, contributing counting scores on vault and bars to USA's gold medal-winning performance in the team final. Despite posting high enough scores to qualify to the all-around and all individual event finals except for vault, she was unable to compete in finals because at least two of her teammates outscored her on each event; a maximum of two gymnasts per country may participate in each event final. On bars, Hurd tied Wong's score of 14.250, but Wong qualified for the final because she had a higher execution score.

At the 2019 U.S. National Championships, Hurd competed on all four events on the first day of competition but fell while performing on floor exercise and ended the night in eighth place in the all-around. On the second day of competition she was able to perform cleanly on each apparatus and finished fourth in the all-around behind Simone Biles, Sunisa Lee, and Grace McCallum.  Additionally, she won silver on the uneven bars behind Lee and placed fifth on balance beam and thirteenth on floor exercise.  As a result, she was added to the national team.

In September Hurd competed at the World team selection camp and placed ninth with a score of 54.100 after mistakes on both floor exercise and uneven bars. On the second day of competition, Hurd competed on uneven bars and balance beam where she recorded the fourth and third highest scores respectively. Following the two-day camp, Hurd was named as a non-traveling alternate for the Worlds team along with Leanne Wong.

In November Hurd signed her National Letter of Intent with the Florida Gators, deferring until after the 2021 World Championships and starting in the 2021–22 school year.

2020
In late 2019 Hurd was selected to represent the USA at the American Cup in March 2020 in Milwaukee.  She was joined by first year senior Kayla DiCello. Hurd finished in first place ahead of DiCello and Hitomi Hatakeda of Japan, with a score of 55.832 in the all-around; she recorded the highest score on bars, the second-highest score on floor exercise, and the third-highest score on vault and balance beam. She debuted some new skills, such as the Downie on uneven bars, and brought back skills which she had previously stopped performing, most notably her tucked full-in dismount on beam.

In August 2020, she had surgery on both elbows.

2021 
Hurd underwent elbow surgery in mid-March.  She later announced that she would be joining Simone Biles' upcoming Gold Over America Tour.  She returned to competition at the U.S. Classic where she competed downgraded routines on balance beam and floor exercise where she finished 11th and 10th respectively.  Hurd was one of five gymnasts featured on the Peacock docuseries Golden: The Journey of USA's Elite Gymnasts.  At the National Championships Hurd once again only competed on balance beam and floor exercise where she finished 26th and 23rd respectively.  She was not added to the national team nor did she qualify to compete at the upcoming Olympic Trials.

NCAA

2021–2022 season 
Hurd was officially added to the Florida Gators roster in January.  Prior to making her debut Hurd announced that she had undergone surgery on her right knee to repair a torn ACL.  She redshirted her freshman year.

2022–2023 season 
Hurd made her collegiate debut on January 6, 2023 in a meet against West Virginia, Ball State, and Lindenwood University.  Hurd competed on two events – uneven bars (8.750) and balance beam (9.775).

Competitive history

Filmography

Streaming

Music videos

References

External links
 
 

2001 births
Living people
American adoptees
American female artistic gymnasts
American sportswomen of Chinese descent
Chinese adoptees
Chinese emigrants to the United States
Medalists at the World Artistic Gymnastics Championships
People from Middletown, Delaware
Sportspeople from Delaware
World champion gymnasts
U.S. women's national team gymnasts
Pan American Games medalists in gymnastics
Pan American Games gold medalists for the United States
Gymnasts at the 2019 Pan American Games
Medalists at the 2019 Pan American Games
21st-century American women
Florida Gators women's gymnasts
LGBT gymnasts
American LGBT sportspeople